Aronow is a surname. Notable people with the surname include:

Abraham Aronow (born 1940), American physician and photographer
Donald Aronow (1927–1987), American boat designer, builder, and racer

See also
Aronow v. United States
Aronov

Jewish surnames